Edwin Sandys (1659–1699) was an English politician, MP for Worcestershire 1695–1698.

He was the eldest son of Samuel Sandys  (a descendant of Edwin Sandys, Archbishop of York) and his wife Elizabeth Pettus, daughter of Sir John Pettus .

Family
On 14 October 1694 he married Alice Rushout, daughter of Sir James Rushout . They had two sons and one daughter:

 Samuel Sandys (1695–1770), Chancellor of the Exchequer, created Baron Sandys in 1743
 Alice Sandys (born 1696), married Captain Daniel Tomkins
 Edwin Sandys (1698–1718?), "bred for the sea and died young", possibly in 1718 on board the Argyle

References

1659 births
1699 deaths
English MPs 1695–1698
Members of the Parliament of England for Worcestershire